John Burroughs (1837–1921) was an American naturalist and nature essayist.

John Burroughs may also refer to:

John Burroughs (governor) (1907–1978), American businessman and governor of New Mexico
John A. Burroughs, Jr. (born 1936), ambassador
John C. Burroughs (1818–1892), American educator from New York
John Coleman Burroughs (1913–1979), American illustrator
John H. Burroughs, naval engineer and shipwright
John J. Burroughs (1798–1872), American lawyer
Sir John Burroughs, 17th-century English soldier
John Burroughs, character in Another Earth
 Sir John Borough or Burroughs, (d. 1643), Garter Principal King at Arms

See also

John Burrough (disambiguation)